Segin may refer to:
Segin, Iran, a village in Kerman Province, Iran
The modern name of the star Epsilon Cassiopeiae (ε Cassiopeiae)
An alternative traditional name of the star Gamma Boötis (γ Boötis)